Christmas is a Jorma Kaukonen studio album released in July 1996.  It was the only themed album Kaukonen recorded and was a departure from the usual Rev. Gary Davis influenced tunes.  It included new Christmas-themed compositions as well old hymns such as "Silent Night."  Like the previous album, The Land of Heroes, Christmas incorporated the work of Michael Falzarano and Fred Bogert. Kaukonen's wife Vanessa also performed vocals and co-wrote one song. It was also the only time Kaukonen performed keyboards on an album.

Track listing
"Downhill Sleigh Ride" (Jorma Kaukonen, Michael Falzarano) – 3:33
"Christmas Rule" (Kaukonen, Falzarano, Vanessa Lillian) – 4:00
"What Child Is This?" (Traditional) – 2:57
"Christmas Blues" (Falzarano) – 4:35
"Journey of the Three Wise Men" (Kaukonen, Falzarano) – 4:36
"Baby Boy" (Traditional) – 3:45
"You're Still Standing" (Falzarano) – 3:26
"Silent Night" (Traditional) – 4:52
"Holiday Marmalade" (Kaukonen, Falzarano) – 11:39
"Holiday Segue" – 0:20

Personnel
Jorma Kaukonen – guitars, keyboards, vocals
Michael Falzarano – rhythm guitar, sleigh bells, vocals
Fred Bogert – bass, keyboards, vocals
Vanessa Lillian – vocals
Chris Munson – drums
Wayne Killius – drums

Production
Jorma Kaukonen – producer
Michael Falzarano – producer
Fred Bogert – engineer
Chris Munson – engineer
Todd Whited – engineer
John Sullivan – photography
Kevin Morgan Studio – design, cover art
Vanessa Lillian Kaukonen – photography

References

Jorma Kaukonen albums
1996 Christmas albums
Christmas albums by American artists
Relix Records albums
Folk rock Christmas albums